Shim Je-hyeok (born March 5, 1995) is a South Korean football player who plays for Yangju Citizen FC.

club career 
30 April 2014, Shim Je-hyeok scored a debut goal at a debut game against Incheon United.

External links 
 

1995 births
South Korean footballers
Association football forwards
Living people
FC Seoul players
Seongnam FC players
K League 1 players
People from Seongnam
Sportspeople from Gyeonggi Province